The Col du Bois Clair (394 m) is a low pass near Sologny, west of Mâcon in the French department of Saône et Loire. It is traversed by Route nationale 79, which connects Mâcon with Paray-le-Monial.

Mountain passes of Bourgogne-Franche-Comté